Qeytak (also Romanized as Qeyţak; also known as Qeyţag) is a village in Qaleh Shahin Rural District, in the Central District of Sarpol-e Zahab County, Kermanshah Province, Iran. At the 2006 census, its population was 362, in 84 families.

References 

Populated places in Sarpol-e Zahab County